Allan Blazek (1949/1950 – August 3, 2021) was a record producer, mixer and audio engineer who had been active since the 1970s. He produced albums by Glenn Frey, REO Speedwagon, Elvin Bishop, J. Geils Band, Michael Stanley, Fandango, The Outlaws and Mike Reilly. He also engineered The Who's album, Face Dances, and engineered the Eagles album, Hotel California. Blazek was born in New Buffalo, Michigan. He joined the army during the Vietnam War, where he developed an interest in records produced by Bill Szymczyk, who would later mentor him. 

Blazek died at the age of 71 on August 3, 2021, in Michigan City, Indiana.

Selected discography
1975
 Eagles - One of These Nights (engineer)
 Rick Derringer - Spring Fever (engineer)
 Elvin Bishop - Struttin' My Stuff (engineer, producer)
 REO Speedwagon - This Time We Mean It (engineer, producer)
1974
 J. Geils Band - Nightmares...and Other Tales from the Vinyl Jungle (engineer)
 Eagles - On the Border (assistant)
 Johnny Winter - Saints & Sinners (engineer)
 Wishbone Ash - There's the Rub (engineer)
1973
 J. Geils Band - Ladies Invited (engineer)
 Michael Stanley - Friends and Legends (engineer)
 The Fabulous Rhinestones - Freewheelin''' (engineer)
 J. Geils Band - Bloodshot (Assistant producer)
 Rick Derringer - All American Boy'' (engineer)

References

1950s births
2021 deaths
Date of birth missing
Record producers
Place of birth missing
Audio production engineers
Year of birth missing